Silene latifolia subsp. alba (formerly Melandrium album), the white campion is a dioecious flowering plant in the family Caryophyllaceae, native to most of Europe, Western Asia and Northern Africa. It is a herbaceous annual, occasionally biennial or a short-lived perennial plant, growing to between 40–80 centimetres tall. It is also known in the US as bladder campion but should not be confused with Silene vulgaris, which is more generally called bladder campion.

The appearance depends on the age of the plant; when young they form a basal rosette of oval to lanceolate leaves 4–10 cm long, and when they get older, forked stems grow from these, with leaves in opposite pairs. The flowers grow in clusters at the tops of the stems, 2.5–3 cm diameter, with a distinctive inflated calyx and five white petals, each petal deeply notched; flowering lasts from late spring to early autumn. The entire plant is densely hairy. Occasional plants with pink flowers are usually hybrids with red campion (Silene dioica).

Habitat and occurrence
White campion grows in most open habitats, particularly wasteland and fields, most commonly on neutral to alkaline soils. Despite the wide array of conditions in which campion can thrive, it prefers sunny areas that have rich and well-drained soil. An example ecoregion of occurrence is in the Sarmatic mixed forests.

It is also named the Grave Flower or Flower of the Dead in parts of England as they are seen often growing on gravesites and around tombstones.

It is naturalised in North America, being found in most of the United States, the greatest concentrations of the plant can be found in the north-central and northeastern sections of the country. S. latifolia is thought to have arrived in North America as a component of ship ballast.

Inbreeding avoidance
In S. latifolia, outbred male offspring were found to sire significantly more progeny than inbred male offspring. This study indicated the occurrence of inbreeding depression in male plants under natural conditions.  In female plants, inbreeding depression significantly affects vegetative growth, age at first flowering and total fitness.

Post-pollination selection occurs in S. latifolia.  After multiple-donor pollination, it was found that pollen or embryo selection likely reduces the occurrence of inbred progeny.

Use among Native Americans
The Ojibwa use an infusion of the alba subspecies as a medicine.

Susceptibility to disease
Silene latifolia is afflicted by the fungal pathogen Microbotryum violaceum, which acts as a sterilizing sexually transmitted infection in this species.

References

latifolia
Flora of Western Asia
Flora of North Africa
Flora of Europe
Dioecious plants
Plants used in traditional Native American medicine
Flora of Lebanon and Syria
Flora of Syria